Holen is a surname. Notable people with the surname include:

Are Holen (born 1945), Norwegian physician and psychiatrist
Arne Holen (born 1944), Norwegian musicologist
Bjarne Holen, Norwegian politician
Ida Marie Holen (born 1958), Norwegian politician
Lars Holen (1912–1994), Norwegian politician

See also